Oregon State University (OSU) is a public land-grant, research university in Corvallis, Oregon. OSU offers more than 200 undergraduate-degree programs along with a variety of graduate and doctoral degrees. It has the 10th largest engineering college in the nation for 2022. Undergraduate enrollment for all colleges combined averages close to 32,000, making it the state's largest university. Out-of-state students make up over one-quarter of undergraduates and an additional 5,500 students are engaged in graduate coursework through the university. Since its founding, over 272,000 students have graduated from OSU. It is classified among "Doctoral Universities – Very high research activity".

Chartered as a land-grant university initially, OSU became one of the four inaugural members of the Sea Grant in 1971. It joined the Space Grant and Sun Grant research consortia in 1991 and 2003. OSU received a record high $449.9 million in research funding for the 2022 fiscal year and has ranked as the state's top earner in research funding for over 50 years.

History

The 1800s 

The university's roots date to 1856, when it was founded as a primary and preparatory community school known as Corvallis Academy. The school's first teacher and principal was John Wesley Johnson, a famous figure in Oregon higher education. Johnson received his secondary education in Corvallis and his undergraduate from Pacific University before working at the new academy. He later attended Yale University and became an instrumental figure in the development and administration of several other early Oregon colleges. Within a decade of its inception, college-level coursework was added to the academy's curriculum, making it the first public college in the region and a magnet for Oregon's young adults seeking a profession. The university has had 11 names since opening, eight of them during the 1800s. Like many of today's land-grant colleges and universities, name changes were common during this period and helped schools better align themselves with some of the largest available grants in agricultural research.

Corvallis area Freemasons played a leading role in developing the early school. Several of the university's largest buildings are named after these early founders. The school offered its first college-level curriculum in 1865, under the administration of the Methodist Episcopal Church, South and the school's first president, William A. Finley.

On August 22, 1868, official articles of incorporation were filed for Corvallis College. October 27, 1868, is known as OSU Charter Day. The Oregon Legislative Assembly designated Corvallis College as the "agricultural college of the state of Oregon" and the state's designated recipient of the Land Grant. Acceptance of this grant required the college to comply with the requirements set forth in the Morrill Land-Grant Acts. The school was then authorized to grant Bachelor of Arts, Bachelor of Science and Master of Arts degrees. The first graduating class was in 1870, with Bachelor of Arts degrees. In 1872, the name of the school was changed to Corvallis State Agricultural College. As the school's name changed so did its mission. Coursework in the sciences and technology became the most popular majors starting in 1900.

The 1900s
 
In 1914, the Oregon State Board of Higher Education, known then as the State Board of Higher Curricula, began assigning specific colleges to Oregon State University and the University of Oregon in an effort to eliminate duplication. "...the board confined studies in engineering and commerce to the Corvallis campus and major work in the liberal arts and related subjects to the University of Oregon in Eugene. This was the first in a series of actions to make the curricula of the two schools separate and distinct."
In 1929 the legislative assembly passed the Oregon Unification Bill, which placed the school under the oversight of the newly formed Oregon State Board of Higher Education. A doctorate in education was first offered in the early 1930s, with the conferral of four Doctor of Philosophy degrees in 1935. That year also saw the creation of the first summer session. The growing diversity in degree programs led to another name change in 1937, when the school became Oregon State College.

The institution's current name, Oregon State University, was adopted on March 6, 1961, by a legislative act signed into law by Governor Mark Hatfield.

Campuses and educational outlets

Main campus (Corvallis) 

The  main campus is the centerpiece of Corvallis, Oregon. It is 83 miles south of Portland, near the middle of the state's Willamette Valley. Much of the main campus was designed by landscape architect John Charles Olmsted in 1906. In 2008, Olmsted's early campus design was designated by the National Register of Historic Places as the Oregon State University Historic District. It is the only college or university campus in Oregon to hold a historic district designation. The Memorial Union was designed by OSU alumnus and renowned Oregon architect, Lee Arden Thomas. It has been recognized as "one of the finest examples of Neoclassical architecture in Oregon."

Branch campus (Bend)
In 2016 OSU completed the construction of a branch campus in Bend. This campus is called OSU-Cascades and offers students living in Oregon's central region an opportunity to attend select classes closer to their homes.

Ecampus (online)
Oregon State offers more than 80 degree and certificate programs made up from a selection of over 1,500 online courses in more than 110 subjects. U.S. News & World Report ranked OSU's online bachelor's degree programs 4th in the nation in 2021 and has ranked them in the top 10 since 2013. In 2021 College Choice ranked the Ecampus liberal arts program number one in the nation. The same faculty teaching on campus also offers many of their programs and courses online through the Oregon State University Ecampus website. Students who pursue an online education at Oregon State earn the same diploma and transcript as on-campus students.

OSU Portland Center (offices, classrooms and meeting spaces)
In 2017, Oregon State University's Portland headquarters were relocated to the newly renovated Meier & Frank building. The building features offices, classrooms and meeting spaces; which fill the entire second floor of the historic downtown Portland building.  Located just across the street from downtown Portland's Pioneer Square are offices for the OSU Extension Service, the OSU Foundation, the OSU Alumni Association, and the OSU Athletics department. The downtown location provides the university with a more central location, in the state's largest city, to maintain a base of operations. Aside from offices, the second floor also provides classroom space for teaching, research and meeting space for outreach engagement - similar to the work at OSU's other campuses in Corvallis and Bend. Executives and university scientists working on major initiatives, such as the Marine Studies Initiative, use the space for lectures and international conferences.
The OSU Portland Center is also an important part of the OSU Advantage partnership. The partnership brings members of private industry, from throughout the world, to Portland to discuss proposed commercialization initiatives.

Organization and administration

Colleges and schools

All academic courses at OSU operate under the quarter-system, which breaks down into four, 11-week terms. The professional disciplines taught at OSU are divided among 11 colleges, an honors college, and a graduate school. Each college has a dean who is responsible for all faculty, staff, students and academic programs. Colleges are divided either into departments administered by a department head/chair or schools administered by a director who oversees program coordinators. Each school or department is responsible for academic programs leading to degrees, certificates, options or minors.

 College of Agricultural Sciences
 College of Business
 College of Earth, Ocean, and Atmospheric Sciences
 College of Education
 College of Engineering
 College of Forestry
 Graduate School
 University Honors College
 College of Liberal Arts
 College of Pharmacy
 College of Public Health and Human Sciences
 College of Science
 College of Veterinary Medicine

Educational extension
The OSU Educational Extension is a section for non-students and adult education.

Extension Service

The OSU Extension service is an agricultural extension established on July 24, 1911, under the leadership of Vice Provost Ivory W. Lyles (OSU Extension Service Administration). There are OSU Extension offices, Combined Experiment & Oregon Agricultural Experiment Stations, and Branch Experiment Stations located throughout the state. 
Programs include 4-H Youth Development, Agriculture and Natural Resources (includes OSU Master Gardener), Family and Community Health/SNAP-Ed, Forestry and Natural Resources, OSU Open Campus, K-12 Outdoor School, and Oregon Sea Grant.

Funding
Together with university leaders, the OSU Foundation publicly launched Oregon State's first comprehensive fundraising campaign, The Campaign for OSU, on October 26, 2007, with a goal of $625 million. Donors exceeded the goal in October 2010 nearly a year ahead of schedule, resulting in a goal increase to $850 million. In March 2012, the goal was raised to $1 billion. At OSU's annual State of the University address in Portland on January 31, 2014, President Edward J. Ray announced that campaign contributions had passed $1 billion, making OSU one of 35 public universities to cross the billion-dollar fundraising mark and one of only two organizations in the Pacific Northwest to reach that milestone. The Campaign for OSU concluded on December 31, 2014, with more than $1.1 billion from 106,000 donors.

The Oregon State University Foundation is a nonprofit organization chartered to raise and administer private funds in support of the university's education, research and outreach, governed by a volunteer board of trustees. It holds net assets exceeding $744 million and manages most of the university's composite endowment, valued at more than $596 million as of 2018.

International partnerships

Oregon State has varied and numerous partnership agreements with international institutions, including James Cook University in Australia, the University of Forestry in Bulgaria, Lincoln University in New Zealand and India's Gokula Education Foundation.

Academic profile

Admissions
Admission to Oregon State is rated "selective" by U.S. News & World Report. The total student enrollment for the 2021–2022 academic term was 33,193, the largest of any university in Oregon.

For fall 2015, OSU received 14,058 freshman applications; 11,016 were admitted (78.4%) and 3,593 enrolled. The average high school grade point average (GPA) of the enrolled freshmen was 3.58, while the middle 50% range of SAT scores were 480-610 for critical reading, 490-630 for math, and 470-590 for writing. The middle 50% range of the ACT Composite score was 21–28.

Teaching
OSU has more majors, minors and special programs than any other university or college in Oregon.

Research
Research has played a central role in the university's overall operations for much of its history. Most of OSU's research continues at the Corvallis campus, but an increasing number of endeavors are underway at various locations throughout the state and abroad. Research facilities beyond the campus include the John L. Fryer Aquatic Animal Health Laboratory in Corvallis, the Seafood Laboratory in Astoria and the Food Innovation Laboratory in Portland.

The university's College of Earth, Ocean and Atmospheric Sciences (CEOAS) operates several laboratories, including the Hatfield Marine Science Center and multiple oceanographic research vessels based in Newport. CEOAS is now co-leading the largest ocean science project in U.S. history, the Ocean Observatories Initiative (OOI). The OOI features a fleet of undersea gliders at six sites in the Pacific and Atlantic Oceans with multiple observation platforms. CEOAS is also leading the design and construction of the next class of ocean-faring research vessels for the National Science Foundation, which will be the largest grant or contract ever received by any Oregon university.

The 2005 Carnegie Classification of Institutions of Higher Education recognized OSU as a "comprehensive doctoral with medical/veterinary" university. It is one of three such universities in the Pacific Northwest to be classified in this category. In 2006, Carnegie also recognized OSU as having "very high research activity", making it the only university in Oregon to attain these combined classifications.

In 1967 the Radiation Center was constructed at the edge of campus, housing a 1.1 MW TRIGA Mark II Research Reactor. The reactor is equipped to utilize Highly Enriched Uranium (HEU) for fuel. U.S. News & World Report's 2008 rankings placed OSU eighth in the nation in graduate nuclear engineering. In the early 2000s, researchers at the campus reactor developed a prototype for an alternative, small-scale reactor to power factories, buildings, and other individual large-scale industrial facilities. More recently, Oregon State University has partnered with a leading manufacturer of small-scale reactors, NuScale, to provide continued research and development for commercial application. 

OSU was one of the early members of the federal Space Grant program. Designated in 1991, the additional grant program made Oregon State one of only 13 schools in the United States at that time to serve as a combined Land Grant, Sea Grant and Space Grant university.

In 2001, OSU's Wave Research Laboratory was designated by the National Science Foundation as a site for tsunami research under the Network for Earthquake Engineering Simulation. The O. H. Hinsdale Wave Research Laboratory is on the edge of the campus and is one of the world's largest and most sophisticated laboratories for education, research and testing in coastal, ocean and related areas.

The National Institute of Environmental Health Sciences funds two research centers at OSU. The Environmental Health Sciences Center has been funded since 1969 and the Superfund Research Center has been funded since 2009.

OSU administers the H.J. Andrews Experimental Forest, a United States Forest Service facility dedicated to forestry and ecology research. The Andrews Forest is a UNESCO International Biosphere Reserve.

OSU's Open Source Lab is a nonprofit founded in 2003 and funded in part by corporate sponsors that include Facebook, Google, and IBM. The organization's goal is to advance open source technology, and it hires and trains OSU students in software development and operations for large-scale IT projects. The lab hosts a number of projects, including a contract with the Linux Foundation.

Military

Oregon State University is one of the few universities to have ROTC detachments for each branch of the US Military. Oregon State University Army ROTC is a distinguished program and has been taught regularly since 1873. The so-called Beaver Battalion is known as the West Point of the West for producing more commissioned officers than any other non-military school during World War II. It is located in McAlexander Fieldhouse, named after General Ulysses G. McAlexander, the former commander of Army ROTC.

After the Second World War ended in 1945, a Department of Naval Science was added at Oregon State. Providing officer training for both the US Navy and the US Marine Corps, it is now one of the largest in the nation and has earned the unofficial title "Naval Academy of the Northwest." On July 1, 1949, the US Army Air Corps training branch became a separate officer training unit now known as Aerospace Science. The Oregon State Air Force ROTC draws more freshmen scholarships than any other AFROTC unit in the nation and has had over 1,000 officers commissioned. In 1977, two graduates of the OSU AFROTC became the first women pilots in the Air Force. Today, the Army and Air Force ROTC programs at the university share the McAlexander Fieldhouse.

Libraries

In 1999, OSU finished a $40 million remodeling of the campus library. Known as the Valley Library, the remodeled building was selected by The Library Journal as its 1999 Library of the Year, the first academic library so named.

Rankings and recognition
In 2021, U.S. News & World Report ranked OSU tied for 139th nationally, tied for 71st top public and tied for 58th "most innovative" university in the U.S., and tied for 277th best globally.

In its 2021 Global Ranking of Academic Subjects, the Academic Ranking of World Universities (ARWU) ranked Oregon State University's oceanography program 5th in the world, its agricultural sciences program in the top 50 worldwide, and its earth sciences, ecology and water resources program among the top 100 worldwide.

Agriculture and forestry at Oregon State University rank 26th in the world (11th in the U.S.), according to QS World University Rankings in 2021.

In 2012, ECONorthwest conducted an economic impact analysis that found that each year OSU has a $2.06 billion economic footprint. $1.93 billion of this total was in the state of Oregon.

Student life 

Corvallis is Oregon's 10th-largest city. It is a relatively small community and many of the local events have a strong connection to the university. OSU has over 400 active student organizations and groups. The campus is only a few hours' driving distance from any number of outdoor recreation opportunities. Several federal and state natural forests and parks are popular student destinations. These include the Cascade Range, a rugged coastline, several large forests, the high desert and numerous rivers and lakes.

From 1930 to 1968, OSU was home to the Gamma chapter of Phrateres, a philanthropic-social organization for female college students. Gamma was the third chapter of the organization, which eventually had over 20 chapters in Canada and the U.S.

Most older OSU students live off campus, but on-campus housing is available and required for most incoming freshmen. There are 16 residence halls on campus, which are organized into individual Hall Councils. The residence halls include Bloss Hall, Buxton Hall, Callahan Hall, Cauthorn Hall, Dixon Lodge, Finley Hall, Halsell Hall, Hawley Hall, International Living-Learning Center, McNary Hall, Poling Hall, Sackett Hall, Tebeau Hall, Weatherford Hall, West Hall, and Wilson Hall. Residents make up the membership and each council holds its own elections to select management over the hall government. All the councils are managed by the Residence Hall Association (RHA).

The LaSells Stewart Center is the conference and performing arts center for the campus. Many famous speakers have graced the stage of the campus's main auditorium, Austin Auditorium, while the Corvallis-OSU Symphony plays there frequently. The OSU Office of Conferences and Special Events is in the auditorium.

The university is home to Orange Media Network, the university's student media department. Orange Media Network encompasses the award-winning The Daily Barometer student newspaper, KBVR 88.7 FM, KBVR-TV, Prism Art and Literary Journal, lifestyle magazine Beaver's Digest, and fashion magazine DAMchic.

Notable among a number of songs commonly played and sung at various events such as commencement, convocation and athletic games are Hail to Old OSU and the Alma Mater.

There is a YMCA-YWCA Round Table at the university.

Student government
The Associated Students of Oregon State University (ASOSU) is the officially recognized student government at Oregon State University and represents all students in campus affairs and at community, state and federal levels regarding issues that directly influence the quality of and access to, post-secondary education.

Diversity

Like most American universities and colleges, OSU actively works to diversify its faculty and staff. In 1993, OSU reported having difficulties retaining and hiring minority faculty members. Only 150 out of 2,284 faculty members were black, Native American, Asian, or Hispanic. In response, the school president and vice president introduced a hiring initiative to promote and enhance diversity. The initiative recognizes the compelling need to build a welcoming and inclusive university community and the direct relationship between excellence and diversity.

In 2007, Scott Reed was named Vice Provost for Outreach and Engagement as OSU Extension Service and OSU Ecampus were aligned under this new division. The university's Ecampus offers a wide array of undergraduate degree programs and courses online to students living throughout the world.
In accordance with the university's mission for diversity, many organizations, clubs, and departments have been formed, including the Office Of Community and Diversity and several cultural and resource centers.

Oregon State University has several cultural centers aimed at promoting diversity and supporting students of color, including the Lonnie B. Harris Black Cultural Center, Native American Longhouse, Asian & Pacific Cultural Center and the Centro Cultural César Chávez.

In addition to its mission of ethnic diversity, Oregon State University supports its lesbian, gay, bisexual and transgender population with a Pride Center.

In the fall of 2022, 30 percent of Oregon State University's total enrollment was composed of students of color.

Athletics

In a 2008 national ranking of academics, athletic opportunity and overall performance, Oregon State was selected as one of America's "premier" universities. The ranking, performed by STACK magazine, placed Oregon State 29th in the nation's "Elite 50" universities and was uncontested within the state for that year. Since then, the University of Oregon has also appeared in the STACK rankings.

The history of Oregon State athletics dates back to 1893 when "Jimmie the Coyote" was recognized as the first official mascot. In 1910, the official mascot was replaced by the beaver and remains the school's mascot to this day. In 1915, the university's varsity athletic teams were invited to join the Pacific Coast (Athletic) Conference as one of four charter members.

Reser Stadium now serves as the home field for the school's football team. The school mascot is Benny the Beaver and first appeared on the football sidelines in 1952. The next year Oregon State added a football stadium to its campus, known then as Parker Stadium. Fundraisers in 2006 and 2007 helped expand Reser Stadium from 35,000 seats to 46,200. A time lapse video recording of the expansion is viewable on the internet. 1962 saw OSU's (and the west coast's) first Heisman Trophy winner, quarterback Terry Baker. The University of Oregon is the university's in-state rival for athletics. The annual Oregon–Oregon State football rivalry football game is one of the longest-running rivalries in all of college football.

The university's home golf course, Trysting Tree's, features championship-worthy golf and practice facilities.  The name of the course can be traced back to a locally famous tree near Community Hall on campus where student couples would meet to make dates. Basketball is held in Gill Coliseum and named after former Beavers coach Slats Gill. The Coliseum is also home to the university's Collegiate wrestling team. Baseball is played in Goss Stadium at Coleman Field. The OSU baseball team, won back-to-back NCAA Division I Baseball Championships in 2006 and 2007 and added a third win in 2018. Softball is held in the OSU Softball Complex. Opened in April 2001, the $1.5 million OSU Softball Complex seats 750. Oregon State hosted a Regional and Super Regional tournament in the 2006 NCAA tournament, winning both and moving on to the Women's College World Series.

Oregon State has a total of four NCAA championships. In addition to the three baseball titles (2006, 2007 and 2018), the Beavers won the 1961 NCAA Men's Cross Country Championship. In 1975, the men's rowing Varsity-4 with coxswain team won the Intercollegiate Rowing Association National Collegiate Rowing Championships in Syracuse, New York, establishing a course record which stood for 15 years. The Oregon State racquetball team has won 10 consecutive USA racquetball intercollegiate championships, beginning in 2008.

The 2018 Oregon State baseball team won the NCAA Division I Championship defeating the Arkansas Razorbacks in three games making it their third title ever in the sport of baseball managed by the same manager from the previous two titles Pat Casey.

People

Faculty and staff

OSU has several notable faculty members, including:
 Bernard Malamud, novelist and short-story writer
 George Poinar Jr., entomology professor whose work extracting DNA from insects fossilized in amber was the inspiration for the novel and film Jurassic Park
 William Appleman Williams, historian
 Ernest H. Wiegand, inventor of the modern Maraschino cherry
 Pat Casey, baseball coach who was named Coach of the Year by several publications in both 2006 and 2007 when he led the baseball team to back-to-back national championships
 Slats Gill, former OSU basketball coach and member of the Naismith Memorial Basketball Hall of Fame
 Corinne Manogue, physicist, best known for clarifying superradiance in both gravitational and electromagnetic contexts
 Tevian Dray, mathematician, co-author of scientific paper "On the existence of solutions to Einstein's equation with nonzero Bondi news"
 Ralph Miller, former OSU basketball coach and member of the Naismith Memorial Basketball Hall of Fame
 Dana Reason, director of the Popular Music Studies Program and acclaimed Canadian pianist and composer
 James Cassidy, soil scientist, bassist and keyboard player for Information Society
 Craig Robinson, former OSU head basketball coach and the brother-in-law of President Barack Obama

Alumni
A complete list of Oregon State alumni is available here.

Oregon State University has numerous nationally and internationally famous alumni who have contributed significantly to their professions. Among over 200,000 OSU alumni, scientist and peace activist Linus Pauling may be the most famous. Pauling is the only recipient of two unshared Nobel Prizes, in the fields of chemistry and peace.

Arts and entertainment

In arts and entertainment, alumni include:
 Wauren Ochs author of "My Chaotic Mind - A Quick Guide to Bipolar Relationships"https://waurenochsbooks.myshopify.com/
 Trevor Bardette, actor
 Geffrey Davis, poet
 Harley Jessup, special-effects production designer, art director
 Cathy Marshall, news anchor
 George Oppen, Pulitzer Prize winner
 Jodi Ann Paterson, model
 Mike Rich, screenwriter
 Travis Rush, country music singer
 Lee Arden Thomas, architect who designed the OSU Memorial Union.
 Sara Jean Underwood, model, actress
Kendra Sunderland, model and pornographic actress (expelled)

Business
In the business world, some OSU alumni hold or have held prominent positions in various industries, including:

 Thomas J. Autzen, plywood manufacturing pioneer and namesake of the University of Oregon's Autzen Stadium
 Mercedes Alison Bates, the first female officer of General Mills and former vice-president of its Betty Crocker Cooking division
 Peggy Cherng, co-founder of Panda Express
 Jen-Hsun Huang, co-founder and CEO of NVIDIA
 Timothy S. Leatherman, inventor of the Leatherman tool and founder of the Leatherman Tool Group
 Don Robert, CEO of Experian
 Brian McMenamin, co-founder of the McMenamins restaurant/hotel/theater chain
 Bernie Newcomb, co-founder of E*TRADE
 Staci Simonich, dean of the College of Agricultural Sciences at Oregon State University
 Leonard Shoen, founder of U-Haul
 John A. Young, former president and CEO of Hewlett-Packard

Military
Several notable OSU alumni are associated with the military, including:

 Edward Allworth, Medal of Honor recipient
 Marion Eugene Carl, World War II flying ace and USMC Major General
 Elmer E. Hall, World War II Brigadier General, USMC
 John Noble Holcomb, Medal of Honor recipient
 Anthony E. Van Dyke, commander of Marine forces at Henderson Hall and Colonel of the USMC
 Ulysses G. McAlexander, Commander of Army ROTC from 1907 to 1911 and again from 1915 to 1917. Earned the nickname "Rock of the Marne" during World War I. Helped with the construction of the Memorial Union and received an honorary doctorate from the university in 1930.

Politics
In politics, notable alumni include the following:
Cecil Andrus, former governor of Idaho and United States Secretary of the Interior
 Rod Chandler, former U.S. Representative
 John Ensign, former U.S. Senator
 John Hubert Hall, former governor of Oregon
 Julia Butler Hansen, former U.S. Representative
 Douglas McKay, former governor of Oregon and U.S. Secretary of the Interior
 Norris Poulson, former U.S. Representative
 Frederick Steiwer, former U.S. Senator
 Lowell Stockman, former U.S. Representative
 Jolene Unsoeld, former U.S. Representative
 Mary Carlin Yates, former U.S. Ambassador to Burundi and Ghana
 Kevin Cameron, former U.S. Representative

Science and engineering
Notable science and engineering alumni include:
 Charity Dean, M.D., MPH&TM, epidemiologist, assistant director of the California Department of Public Health in 2020 during the COVID-19 pandemic in the United States, co-founder and CEO of The Public Health Company.
 Douglas Engelbart, winner National Medal of Technology, known for computer mouse and Mother of all Demos.
 Paul H. Emmett, staff of the Manhattan Project
 Milton Harris, founder of Harris Research Laboratories and former chair of the board of directors of the American Chemical Society
 Sara Harris, climate scientist and 3M National Teaching Fellow at the University of British Columbia
 Wayne L. Hubbell, Jules Stein Professor of Ophthalmology at UCLA
 Donald M. Kerr, wildlife biologist and founder of the High Desert Museum
 Linus Pauling, only winner of two unshared Nobel prizes, chemist known for advancing the theory of the chemical bond and the concept of ortho-molecular medicine.
 Stephen O. Rice, a pioneer in the related fields of information theory, communications theory, and telecommunications
Ada-Rhodes Short, mechatronic design engineer and transgender rights activist
Ann Streissguth, academic and medical researcher known for her work on fetal alcohol syndrome
 William Tebeau, first African-American male graduate, chemical engineering, 1948, namesake of William Tebeau Residence Hall
Earl A. Thompson, inventor of the manual transmission synchronizer in 1923 and leader of the team at General Motors Corporation that developed the first Hydramatic automatic transmission in 1940
Marta Torres, marine geologist known for her work on the geochemistry of cold seeps and methane hydrates
 Michael Waterman, co-inventor of the Smith-Waterman algorithm used in DNA sequence alignment. Holds an Endowed Associates Chair in Biological Sciences, Mathematics and Computer Science at the University of Southern California. One of the foundational and lead figures in the field of computational biology.

Sports
Oregon State athletes have had a significant showing in professional sports, including more than 15 MLB players, more than 20 NBA players and more than 130 NFL players.

 Derek Anderson, NFL Pro Bowler
 Terry Baker, Quarterback, Heisman Trophy winner in 1962
 Darwin Barney, 2012 Gold Glove Award and 2012 Fielding Bible Award winner
 Brent Barry, former NBA player
 Brandin Cooks, wide receiver for the Los Angeles Rams
 Bella Bixby (born 1995), goalkeeper for Portland Thorns FC and United States women's national soccer team
 Ben Carter (born 1994), American-Israeli basketball player in the Israel Basketball Premier League
 Colby Covington, professional Mixed Martial Artist, former UFC interim Welterweight Champion
Jared Cunningham - basketball player in the Israeli Basketball Premier League
 Michael Conforto, MLB All-Star and former New York Mets outfielder
Nathan Coy, mixed martial artist, former Maximum Fighting Championship welterweight champion
 Jacoby Ellsbury, MLB All-Star, two-time World Series champion and former New York Yankees center fielder
 Dick Fosbury, Olympian high jumper and creator of the Fosbury Flop
 A. C. Green, former NBA player nicknamed "Iron Man", NBA All-Star and 3-time NBA Champion
 Les Gutches, NCAA titles 1995 and 1996, 1996 Olympic Team, Dan Hodge Trophy as the nation's best college wrestler in 1996, Freestyle Wrestling World Champion, Member of National Wrestling Hall of Fame
Mike Hass NFL reeciver 2006-2010, member of College Football Hall of Fame
Johnny Hekker, NFL Punter, 2021 Super Bowl Champion, Pr] Bowl (2014, 2016, 2017, 2018)
 T. J. Houshmandzadeh, NFL Pro Bowler
 Joni Huntley, first American woman to high jump over 
 Steven Jackson, former Running back, NFL Pro Bowler 
 Chad Johnson, former NFL wide receiver/Pro Bowler
 Steven Kwan, Cleveland Guardians outfielder, 2022 Gold Glove Award and 2022 Fielding Bible Award winner (Rookie season)
 Gary Payton, 2006 NBA champion, member of the Basketball Hall of Fame and 9-time NBA All-Star
Gary Payton II, 2022 NBA champion, currently playing for the Golden State Warriors. Son of Gary Payton
 Jordan Poyer, NFL All Pro Safety, Buffalo Bills
 Robin Reed, undefeated amateur wrestler
 Adley Rutschman, Baltimore Orioles catcher and 2022 Louis M. Hatter Most Valuable Oriole Award (Rookie season)
Tracy Smith, 1968 U.S. Olympic team, 10,000 meters; world-record holder, 3-mile; 6-time AAU national champion
Sean Mannion, quarterback for the Minnesota Vikings
 Markus Wheaton, wide receiver for the Chicago Bears
Bill Wold, basketball player for the Hapoel Tel Aviv basketball team in the Israeli Basketball Premier League

Others
Other notable alumni include:
 Stacy Allison, First American woman to reach the summit of Mount Everest
 Pamela Cytrynbaum, journalist and restorative justice practitioner 
 William Oefelein, NASA astronaut
 Hüsnü Özyeğin, Turkish billionaire businessman, philanthropist
 Jodi Ann Paterson, Playboy Playmate of The Year
 Donald Pettit, NASA astronaut
 Ernest H. Taves, psychiatrist, author and UFO skeptic
 Sara Jean Underwood, Playboy Playmate of The Year

Points of interest

 Endurance Array
 Hatfield Marine Science Center
 Linus Pauling Institute
 O. H. Hinsdale Wave Research Laboratory
 Oregon State University Cascades Campus
 Oregon State University Radiation Center
 Peavy Arboretum

Further reading
 Annual Catalogue of Officers and Students, Corvallis State Agricultural College, 1873-1874. Salem, OR: E.H. White, 1874. —Includes several annual volumes listing professors, alumni, students, and college regulations.

Notes

References

External links

 
 Oregon State Athletics website
 

 
1868 establishments in Oregon
Buildings and structures in Benton County, Oregon
Education in Corvallis, Oregon
Educational institutions established in 1858
Educational institutions established in 1868
Land-grant universities and colleges
Pharmacy schools in Oregon
Universities and colleges accredited by the Northwest Commission on Colleges and Universities
Veterinary schools in the United States
Tourist attractions in Benton County, Oregon
Public universities and colleges in Oregon